Events from the year 1609 in Denmark.

Incumbents 
 Monarch - Christian IV
 Steward of the Realm;

Events

Births 
 18 March – Frederick III of Denmark, king of Denmark and Norway (died 1670)
 16 December – Anne Gøye,  noblewoman and book collector (died 1681)

Full date missing
 Hannibal Sehested, statesman (died 1666)

Deaths 
 Arild Huitfeldt, historian (born 1536)

References 

 
Denmark
Years of the 17th century in Denmark